Sara Cakarevic (born 12 March 1997) is a French tennis player.

She has a career-high WTA singles ranking of 304, achieved on 23 July 2018. Cakarevic also has a career-high WTA doubles ranking of 319, achieved on 30 October 2017. She has won three singles titles and one doubles title on the ITF Women's Circuit.

Cakarevic made her Grand Slam main-draw debut at the 2018 French Open where she received a wildcard into the women's doubles tournament, partnering Jessika Ponchet.

Grand Slam performance timelines

Singles

Doubles

ITF Circuit finals

Singles: 7 (3 titles, 5 runner-ups)

Doubles: 4 (1 title, 3 runner–ups)

Notes

References

External links
 
 

1997 births
Living people
French female tennis players
French people of Serbian descent
French people of Montenegrin descent